A Marine Security Guard (MSG), also known as a Marine Embassy Guard, is a member of the Marine Corps Embassy Security Group (formerly Marine Security Guard Battalion), a brigade-sized organization of the United States Marine Corps (USMC) whose detachments provide security at American embassies, American consulates and other official United States Government offices such as the United States Mission to NATO in Brussels, Belgium.  The Marine Security Guard was designated MOS 8151, though this has changed to MOS 8156.

The USMC has a long history of cooperation with the U.S. State Department, going back to the early days of the country. From the raising of the American flag at Derna, Tripoli, and the secret mission of Archibald H. Gillespie in California, to the Boxer Rebellion in Beijing, Marines have served many times on special missions as couriers, as guards for embassies and delegations, and to protect American citizens in unsettled areas.

The formal and permanent use of Marines as security guards began with the Foreign Service Act of 1946, which authorized the Secretary of Navy to, upon the request of the Secretary of State, assign Marines to serve as custodians under the supervision of the senior diplomatic officer at a diplomatic post. The first joint Memorandum of Agreement was signed on 15 December 1948 regarding the provisions of assigning Marines overseas. Trained at the Foreign Service Institute, the first Marines arrived at Tangier and Bangkok in early 1949. The Marine Corps assumed the primary training responsibility in November 1954. Although embassy duty is a crucial aspect of the Marines’ mission with a long tradition, the Corps is only budgeted to train and maintain a limited cadre of guards to cover over 100 embassies worldwide. In response to the 2012 Benghazi attack, Congress ordered a near doubling of Marine Security Guards in the midst of a post-war drawdown in overall USMC numbers. The USMC has responded by redeploying one company from 1st Battalion 1st Marines while additional guards are trained.

Responsibilities

The primary mission of the MSG is to provide security, particularly the protection of classified information and equipment vital to the national security of the United States at American diplomatic posts. This is accomplished under the guidance and operational control of a civilian federal agent of the Diplomatic Security Service, known as the Regional Security Officer (RSO) who is the senior U.S. law enforcement representative and security attaché at U.S. diplomatic posts around the world. In addition, MSGs provide security for visiting American dignitaries and frequently assist the RSO in supervising host country or locally employed security forces that provide additional security for the exterior of embassies. The MSGs fall under operational control of the RSO and are administratively controlled by the Marine Corps Embassy Security Group. The secondary mission of Marine Security Guards is to provide protection for U.S. citizens and U.S. Government property located within designated U.S. Diplomatic and Consular premises during exigent circumstances, which require immediate aid or action.

MSGs focus on the interior security of a diplomatic post's buildings. In only the most extreme emergency situations are they authorized to provide special protection to the senior diplomatic officer off the diplomatic compound. MSGs carry a certain level of diplomatic immunity in the performance of their official duties.

Organization
The Marine Security Guards number approximately a thousand Marines at 174 posts (also known as "detachments"), organized into nine regional MSG commands and located in over 135 countries in 18 time zones, as well as its headquarters at Marine Corps Base Quantico. Headquarters Company, along with MSG School, is composed of approximately 100 Marines providing administrative, logistical, legal, training and education support.

The remaining nine regions are commanded by a lieutenant colonel, and typically entail a number of detachments in several countries. The companies are as follows:

Each Detachment is commanded by a Staff Non-Commissioned Officer, being one of the few instances where an enlisted Marine may hold the title of "commander". Generally between the ranks of Staff Sergeant and Master Gunnery Sergeant, Marine Detachment Commanders serve two tours, which generally last 18 months each. Unlike their subordinates, however, Detachment Commanders may be married. The minimum detachment size is seven MSGs (Marine Security Guards) and a one detachment commander. This allows for posts to be manned at all times while allowing each of the Marines to conduct other routine training, internal management of the detachment and have some time off.
A Marine Security Guard usually serves three 12-month tours of duty. Marine Security Guard "watch standers" are enlisted Marines from the rank of Private First Class to Staff Sergeant.

Duty

After every three years as a Marine Security Guard with the Marine Corps Embassy Security Group, any Marine is entitled to the Marine Corps Security Guard Ribbon.  According to the Marine Corps Uniform Regulations Order (Section 4-4a Line 24) Marine Security Guards are authorized to wear subsequent service stars.

Marines of any Military Occupational Specialty may volunteer for a three-year tour of duty; however, non-Staff NCOs with dependants are not eligible, as well as Marines with potentially offensive tattoos, legal or security restrictions, non–United States citizenship, dual citizenship, significant financial indiscretions, and any other restriction that would prevent a top secret clearance.

Before being assigned to a Foreign Service post, a Marine accepted into the MSG program must successfully complete a training program located at the Marine Corps Embassy Security Group (MCESG), which is located at Marine Corps Base Quantico, Virginia. Marine Security Guard duty is one of a few special duty assignments available to qualified Marines. Marine Security Guard duty can be dangerous; there have been instances where Marines have been killed during this duty (most recently, Cpl Steve Crowley in 1979, Cpl Robert V. McMaugh in 1983, and Sgt Jesse Aliganga in 1998). Embassy duty is a crucial aspect of the Marine Corps' mission with a long tradition; the Corps is currently tasked to train and maintain a cadre of guards to cover 181 embassies and consulates worldwide with the ability to augment assigned forces as necessary.

See also
 Marine Corps Security Guard Ribbon
 Marine Corps Security Force Regiment
 White House sentries
 Embassy of the United States, Baghdad

References

Frampton, James Scott, The Influence of Attitudes and Morale on the Performance of Active-Duty United States Marine Corps Female Security Guards (2011)

External links

Marine Corps Embassy Security Group Official Website

Marine Security Guard Battalion on GlobalSecurity.org
Marine Security Guard Battalion on specialoperations.com
Marine Embassy Guard Association

United States Department of State
Military units and formations of the United States Marine Corps
Military in Virginia
United States military presence in other countries